The 46th edition of the annual Hypo-Meeting took place on May 29 and May 30, 2021 in Götzis, Vorarlberg (Austria). The track and field competition, featuring a men's decathlon and a women's heptathlon event is part of the 2021 World Athletics Challenge – Combined Events.

The event did not take place in 2020.

References

External links 
 Official website

Hypo-Meeting
Hypo-Meeting
Hypo-Meeting
Hypo-Meeting